The 2015 New Mexico Lobos football team represented the University of New Mexico during the 2015 NCAA Division I FBS football season. The Lobos were led by fourth-year head coach Bob Davie. They played their home games at University Stadium and were members of the Mountain Division of the Mountain West Conference. They finished the season 7–6, 5–3 in Mountain West play to finish in a four-way tie for second place. They were invited to the New Mexico Bowl where they lost to Arizona.

Schedule

Schedule Source:

Game summaries

Mississippi Valley State

Tulsa

at Arizona State

at Wyoming

New Mexico State

at Nevada

Hawaii

at San Jose State

Utah State

at Boise State

Colorado State

Air Force

New Mexico Bowl–Arizona

References

New Mexico
New Mexico Lobos football seasons
New Mexico Lobos football